Holospira bilamellata, common name bilamellate holospira, is a species of air-breathing land snail, a terrestrial pulmonate gastropod mollusk in the family Urocoptidae.

References

External links 
 Manual of Conchology. volume 15, Urocoptidae. pages 82-83.

Urocoptidae
Gastropods described in 1895